A leather jacket is a coat made of real or imitation leather.

Leather jacket or leatherjacket may also refer to:
Leather Jackets (album), a 1986 album by Elton John
Leather Jackets (film), a 1992 crime drama film by Lee Drysdale
Leather Jacket (film), a 2023 Iranian film
Barklya syringifolia or leather jacket, a species of Australian trees
 Leatherjacket fish, Oligoplites saurus, a species of jack in the family Carangidae
 Leatherjacket or filefish, family of tropical to subtropical tetraodontiform marine fish
 Leatherjacket, the larva of the crane fly